Phalga is a genus of moths of the family Euteliidae. The genus was erected by Moore in 1881.

The Global Lepidoptera Names Index considers this name to be a synonym of Eutelia.

Species
Phalga clarirena (Sugi, 1982) Japan
Phalga sinuosa Moore, 1881 north-eastern Himalayas, Thailand, Sundaland, Sulawesi

References

Euteliinae